The third season of the American television spy drama Burn Notice premiered on June 4, 2009 on the cable television channel USA Network. Season three consists of sixteen episodes, split between a nine-episode summer season and a seven-episode winter season.

Season overview 
Season 3 picks up with Westen, having lost the protection of "Management," now under surveillance by Miami Detective Paxson (Moon Bloodgood), who has been tasked with monitoring his activities. Michael can secure the arrest of a major Miami criminal Paxson has long been targeting, and he threatens to reveal the true circumstances of the arrest if Paxson does not stop following him. Paxson agrees to the deal. Michael is soon contacted by a man named Tom Strickler (Ben Shenkman), a "smooth-talking, gregarious freelance spy broker", who offers to unburn Michael in exchange for his help with a potentially lethal job. It is clear to Michael that Strickler has major, if shadowy, connections, but appears to be the first person he has met capable of getting him his old job back. At first, it seems to work, and Michael can confirm, through interactions with undercover CIA agent Diego Garza (Otto Sanchez), that movement is being made on his burn notice. In the midseason finale, however, Michael is forced to kill Strickler to save Fiona's life. The action has unforeseen consequences, including the murder of Agent Garza.

Following Strickler's death, Westen is contacted by an associate named Mason Gilroy (Chris Vance), who is responsible for the murder of Garza. Gilroy informs Michael that he wants Michael's help on an extremely lucrative operation. Believing Gilroy to be planning something dangerous, Michael plays along to uncover the plot to eventually foil it. After performing several errands for Gilroy, Michael learns that the job involves a maximum security prisoner being rendered from Chile to Poland. Gilroy's job is to divert the plane to Miami, but he is double-crossed and blown up. Before dying, he informs Michael that the man behind the operation is named Simon (Garret Dillahunt), a man who committed the crimes used to burn Michael. In the Season 3 finale, Michael solicits help from Management to stop Simon. Michael successfully captures Simon but is arrested himself, while Management states that Michael has a "big future." Michael is taken to a mysterious room, where he sits as the season ends.

Actor Michael Weston appeared in one episode as a schizophrenic MIT graduate who needs Michael to protect him from what he thinks are aliens selling the names of undercover spies. Also, Sharon Gless was nominated for the Primetime Emmy Award for Outstanding Supporting Actress in a Drama Series for her work in this season. Gless was also reunited with her former Cagney & Lacey co-star, Tyne Daly, for the episode "A Dark Road".

Cast 

Jeffrey Donovan returned for the third season as series protagonist Michael Westen.  Gabrielle Anwar also returned as Fiona Glenanne, while Bruce Campbell reprised his role as Sam Axe.  Sharon Gless returned to play Madeline Westen.

The third season featured a host of guest stars and recurring guests.  Paul Tei returned as Michael's favorite money-launderer, Barry Burkowski.  Seth Peterson returned as Michael's brother, Nate Westen.  The character of Detective Michelle Paxson was introduced, portrayed by Moon Bloodgood.  Another handler for Michael, Tom Strickler, was portrayed in a variety of episodes by Ben Shenkman.  Otto Sanchez portrayed Michael's CIA contact Diego Garza.  A self-proclaimed "freelance psychopath," Mason Gilroy, was played by Chris Vance.  John Mahoney returned as the mysterious man known only as Management.  Several villains from previous seasons returned, including Tim Matheson as "Dead" Larry Sizemore and Jay Karnes as the vengeful Tyler Brennen.  A former villain, Sugar (Arturo Fernandez), returned needing Michael's help.  Marc Macaulay and Brandon Morris returned as Agents Harris and Lane in a single episode.  Garret Dillahunt was introduced as Simon Escher, the man who actually committed the crimes Michael was framed for.  Various actors made guest appearances during the season, including Carlos Bernard, Jude Ciccolella, Clayne Crawford, Tyne Daly, Callie Thorne, and Danny Trejo.

Episodes

References

External links 
 

2009 American television seasons
2010 American television seasons